Manat Wongwat (born 15 July 1960) is a former Thai air force officer. He served as commander-in-chief of the Royal Thai Air Force from 1 October 2019 to 30 September 2020. Airbull Suttiwan was appointed as his successor.

References 

Living people
1960 births
Manat Wongwat
Manat Wongwat
Manat Wongwat